St Stephen's Catholic College, (also known as "St Stephen's"), is a Catholic co-educational high school in Mareeba, Queensland, Australia.

St Stephen's is a secondary school located in Mareeba, approximately 60 km west of Cairns. Founded under much public consultation in 2006, St Stephen's was developed to provide the community of Mareeba with a local high school. Although originally planned as a co-institutional arrangement with Education Queensland in 1998, the Diocesan Education Board of Governance gave its approval for the establishment of a Catholic secondary college in 2002. By the end of 2004 all approval had been gained, and by Feb 2005 an interim College Board was formed. By the next month the Foundation Principal, Gerard Simon, was appointed, and by April the name St Stephen's was chosen.

The College now boasts three computer laboratories, a 400m running track, a sports area, a self-serve tuckshop, four science laboratories, a Trade training centre and a Performing Arts Centre. The school has cricket, soccer, rugby league, netball and basketball facilities.

Pastoral houses 
St Stephen's has four pastoral houses which are represented on its college crest. The names have a historic perspective which has influenced the culture of the college. The houses are as follows:

 Augustine House (gold)
 Deacon House (red)
 McAuley House (blue)
 Muluridji House (green)

These four houses compete against each in many activities, including annual Athletics and Swimming Carnivals and Cross Country. These events build up to a House Cup which is awarded at the end of each year. A house is also awarded a Participation Cup, won from house points gained from voluntary participation in various activities throughout the year.

Honour board

See also
Catholic Education Cairns
List of schools in Far North Queensland

References

External links
 St Stephen's Catholic College Website

Schools in Cairns
Catholic secondary schools in Queensland
Educational institutions established in 2006
2006 establishments in Australia